Hogna ingens, the Deserta Grande wolf spider, is a critically endangered spider species endemic to the Deserta Grande Island of the Madeira archipelago - specifically a remote valley, the Vale de Castanheira. Adult numbers have been estimated at less than 5,000, making it one of the rarest wolf spider species. It is also believed to be one of the largest wolf spiders on earth, with a  leg span for the female, somewhat smaller for the male (the Latin ingens means "huge" or "monstrous"). Coloration is grey and black with white spots on the legs. The spider hides under rocks and crevices on this volcanic island, but its habitat is being invaded by the grass Phalaris aquatica, while the native vegetation is damaged by introduced goats and rabbits. The spider preys on smaller relatives, millipedes and other insects, and even small lizards. It is capable of delivering a painful and venomous bite to humans.

History

Hogna ingens was first described by John Blackwall in 1857, as Lycosa ingens.

In 2016 a captive breeding programme was set up at Bristol Zoo with 25 individuals being captured and taken to the zoo, over 1000 spiderlings were produced in 2017 and it is hoped that some of these can be reintroduced to Desertas to boost populations.

References

Lycosidae
Spiders of Macaronesia
Arthropods of Madeira
Endemic fauna of Madeira
Spiders described in 1857
Taxa named by John Blackwall